Sancho Panza is the name of a cigar brand in Cuba dating from 1848, and still produced there for Habanos S.A., the Cuban state-owned tobacco company.

History
Named for the squire to Don Quixote in Miguel de Cervantes' 1605 novel of the same name, the name "Sancho Panza" was first used for a Havana cigar in 1848, when the marca of "Sancho Panza" was registered by Don Emilio Ohmsted.  The original factory was located at 48 Angeles St. in Havana. Sometime during the 1880s, the brand was acquired by Ramon Allones and in 1940 was purchased by the Rey Del Mundo Cigar Co.  The Sancho Panza factory and its assets were nationalized by the Cuban government on September 15, 1960.

Products
Today, Sancho Panza cigars in Cuba are handmade from long-filler tobacco from the Vuelta Abajo region of Cuba. The brand is known for the larger sizes in its range, including the enormous Sanchos and the Belicosos. In most sizes, Sancho Panza cigars are considered to be medium-bodied for Cuban cigars, and have been described as having a distinctive, somewhat salty taste.

Non-Cuban production
In the United States, the Sancho Panza trademark was registered in 1981 by Villazon & Company, and the trademark was later acquired by the General Cigar Company. General Cigar markets a line of Honduran cigars with the Sancho Panza brand name incorporating a Honduran or Connecticut Broadleaf wrapper and binder.

Cuban handmade vitolas
The range of sizes produced by Habanos S.A. today comprises several vitolas including the Molinos or 'mill', which is a Cervantes size. 
 Bachilleres	Vitola de Galera: Franciscanos
Length: 116 mm (4 5/8") Ring Gauge: 40 (15.88 mm)	
 Belicosos	Vitola de Galera: Campanas (figurado)
Length: 140 mm (5 1/2") Ring Gauge: 52 (20.64 mm)
	
 Coronas	Vitola de Galera: Coronas
Length: 142 mm (5 5/8") Ring Gauge: 42 (16.67 mm)
 Coronas Gigantes	Vitola de Galera: Julieta No. 2
Length: 178 mm (7") Ring Gauge: 47 (18.65 mm)
 Molinos	Vitola de Galera: Cervantes
Length: 165 mm (6 1/2") Ring Gauge: 42 (16.67 mm)
 Non Plus	Vitola de Galera: Marevas
Length: 129 mm (5 1/8") Ring Gauge: 42 (16.67 mm)
 Sanchos	Vitola de Galera: Gran Corona
Length: 235 mm (9 1/4") Ring Gauge: 47 (18.65 mm)

Source: Habanos S.A.

References

Cigar brands
Cuban brands
Habanos S.A. brands